Athous turcicus is a species of brown-coloured click beetle of the family Elateridae known from North Macedonia and Greece.

References

Beetles described in 1905
Beetles of Europe